Wola Kopcowa  is a village in the administrative district of Gmina Masłów, within Kielce County, Świętokrzyskie Voivodeship, in south-central Poland.

The village has a population of 1,010.

References

Wola Kopcowa